The Brothers Martin are an indie rock band from Riverside, California consisting of brothers Ronnie Martin and Jason Martin. Musically, they incorporate elements of both Joy Electric and Starflyer 59 (Ronnie and Jason's primary music projects, respectively): electropop and shoegazing, while modern rock and 1980s new wave are also a central influence.

As of November 2008, the band was dropped from the "Current Artists" section of the Tooth & Nail website. While there has never been any word from the Martin brothers, it is assumed that The Brothers Martin was a one-time project.

Members
Official
 Ronnie Martin - synthesizers, lead vocals
 Jason Martin - bass, guitar, lead vocals
Session & Live
 Alex Albert - drums

Success 
Almost instantly after their first appearance at PureVolume, The Brothers Martin became the site's No. 1 artist, topping My Chemical Romance and Anberlin and were also the site's featured artist.

"The Missionary" was played at the end of the series premiere of NBC television show Chuck.

Discography

See also
Dance House Children

References

External links 
Tooth & Nail artist profile
The Brothers Martin at MySpace

Christian rock groups from California
Tooth & Nail Records artists
Musical groups established in 2006
Musical groups disestablished in 2008
Musical groups from Riverside County, California